Govera was a chiefdom in Zimbabwe. It was founded some time around 1788 and persisted into the late 19th century. It became a part of the British Mashonaland protectorate in 1889.

References

History of Zimbabwe